Bügür County (transliterated from Mongolian), also known from Mandarin Chinese as Luntai County,  is a county in central Xinjiang Uyghur Autonomous Region under the administration of the Bayin'gholin Mongol Autonomous Prefecture. According to the 2002 census, it has a population of 90,000.

Luntai has a long history associated with China. When the city refused aid to Li Guangli's Fergana campaign (c. 101 BC), the inhabitants were slaughtered. Around 80 BC, a Han military colony was established on the site.

, there was about 25,100 acres (165,700 mu) of cultivated land in Bugur.

Demographics

Climate

References 

Further Readings
 Yap, Joseph P, (2019). The Western Regions, Xiongnu and Han, from the Shiji, Hanshu and Hou Hanshu. 

County-level divisions of Xinjiang
Bayingolin Mongol Autonomous Prefecture